Anthony L. "Tony" Brown (August 15, 1961) is a former Democratic member of the Kansas House of Representatives, who represented the 10th district.  He served from 2009 - 2011.  Brown ran for re-election in 2010, but was defeated by Republican TerriLois Gregory.

Prior to his election to the House, Brown served on the Baldwin City City Council from 2004-2008.  He received Master's and Doctoral degrees from Vanderbilt University, and has worked as a professor at Baker University.

A member of the local Chamber of Commerce and Lions club, Brown lives in Baldwin City with his wife Becky and daughter Halley.

Committee membership
 Energy and Utilities
 Higher Education
 Agriculture
 Natural Resources

Major donors
The top 5 donors to Brown's 2008 campaign:
1. Brown, Tony 	$51,644 	
2. Kansas Democratic Party 	$26,500 	
3. Kansas National Education Assoc 	$1,000
4. Kansas AFL 	$500 	
5. Kansas Trial Lawyers Assoc 	$500

References

External links
 Official campaign site
 Kansas Legislature - Tony Brown
 Project Vote Smart profile
 Kansas Votes profile
 Follow the Money campaign contributions:
 2008

Democratic Party members of the Kansas House of Representatives
Living people
People from Baldwin City, Kansas
21st-century American politicians
1961 births
Vanderbilt University alumni